Martín Coronado is a town in Tres de Febrero Partido of Buenos Aires Province, Argentina. It is located in the Greater Buenos Aires urban agglomeration.

Name
The town was originally called Villa Lacroze after the original name of the railway station. In 1920 the population accepted a proposal that the town be renamed  after Martín Coronado, an important artist in the late 19th and early 20th century who lived in the area.

External links

Populated places in Buenos Aires Province
Tres de Febrero Partido